Keep Your Eye on Me is a pop/R&B/dance album by Herb Alpert, released in 1987.  It contains two hit singles, "Diamonds" and "Making Love in the Rain" (both featuring lead and background vocals by Janet Jackson and Lisa Keith). These Billboard Top 40 hits, along with the title track and "Pillow" (featuring co-lead vocals by Alpert and singer/wife Lani Hall) were written and produced by Jimmy Jam & Terry Lewis. The remainder of the album consists of tracks produced by Herb Alpert and various producers.  The record was constructed with Side 1 (Tracks 1-5) featuring uptempo songs, while Side 2 (Tracks 6-10) featured down tempo songs and ballads.

All trumpet solos were played by Herb Alpert.

The album was released on CD by A&M Records in 1987, along with extended CD singles of the title track and "Diamonds". It was re-released on September 12, 2013 in a download-only version available exclusively through Alpert's official website, HerbAlpertPresents.com.

Track listing

  "Keep Your Eye on Me" (Jimmy Jam, Terry Lewis) 5:13
  "Hot Shot" (Albert Hammond) 3:56
  "Diamonds" (Jam, Lewis) 4:53
  "Traffic Jam" (Les Pierce) 3:16
  "Cat Man Do" (Roy Bittan, Herb Alpert) 5:26
  "Pillow" (Jam, Lewis) 4:32
  "Our Song" (Alpert, Sal Macaluso) 3:55
  "Making Love in the Rain" (Jam, Lewis) 5:56
  "Rocket to the Moon" (John Barnes, Alpert) 3:52
 "Stranger on the Shore" (Mr. Acker Bilk, R. Mellin)  2:54

Personnel

 Tracks 1, 3, 6 and 8 Produced by Jimmy Jam and Terry Lewis for Flyte Tyme Productions, Inc.; Executive Producer: John McClain;Jimmy Jam: drum programming, keyboard programming, percussion (track 1, 3, 6 and 8), Fairlight programming (track 6), Oberheim programming (track 6); Terry Lewis: bass (track 3), percussion (track 3 and 6), background vocals (track 1, 3, 6 and 8); David Eiland: keyboard programming, sound FX sampler (track 1); Jerome Benton: background vocals (track 1); Lisa Keith: lead vocals (track 3 and 8), background vocals (track 1 and 6); Janet Jackson: lead vocals (track 3 and 8); Jellybean Johnson, James "Popeye" Greer: party vocals (track 3)
 Tracks 2, 7 and 9 Produced by Herb AlpertLaytham Armor: drums, keyboards, bass programming (track 2), synthesized bass, synthesizer, percussion programming (track 7); Michael Landau: guitar (track 2 and 9); Paul Jackson, Jr.: guitar (track 9); Paulinho Da Costa: percussion (track 2 and 9); John Barnes: organ (ftrack 2), keyboards (track 7 and 9), drum programming (track 9), Jeff Porcaro: drums (track 9); Neil Stubenhaus: bass (track 9)
 Track 4 Produced by Herb Alpert; Associate Producer: Les PierceLes Pierce: drums, keyboard programming; Michael Landau: guitar
 Track 5 Produced by Herb Alpert and Roy BittanRoy Bittan: keyboards; John Barnes: Yamaha DX7 keyboard; Paulinho Da Costa: percussion; Michael Landau: guitar; Jeff Porcaro: drums; Neil Stubenhaus: bass
 Track 10 Produced by Herb Alpert and Shelly YakusJohn Barnes: Yamaha DX7 keyboard, Fairlight programming; Steve Schaeffer: drums, percussion; Michael Landau: guitar

References 

Herb Alpert albums
1987 albums
Albums produced by Jimmy Jam and Terry Lewis
Albums produced by Herb Alpert
A&M Records albums